The following is a list of notable University of Essex people (in chronological or alphabetical order).

Chancellors

 Rab Butler (1966–1982)
 Sir Patrick Nairne (1982–1997)
 Michael Nolan, Baron Nolan (1997–2002)
 Andrew Phillips, Baron Phillips of Sudbury (2003–2014)
 Shami Chakrabarti (2014–2017)
 John Bercow (2017–2022)

Notable faculty

Vice-Chancellors
 Sir Albert Sloman (1963–1987)
 Martin Harris (1987–1993)
 Ron J. Johnston (1993–1995)
 Sir Ivor Crewe (1995–2007)
 Colin Riordan (2007–2012)
 Anthony Forster (2012–present)

Economics
 George Christopher Archibald - Professor (1964–1971)
 Anthony Barnes Atkinson - Professor of Economics (1971 to 1976)
 Rex Bergstrom - Professor of Economics (1970–1992)
 Graciela Chichilnisky - Chair in Economics (1980 to 1981)
 Sanjeev Goyal - Professor of Economics (2003-2006)
 Oliver Hart - Lecturer in Economics (1974 to 1975)
 Ravi Kanbur - Professor in economics (1983–87)
 David Laidler - Lecturer (1966–1969)
 Richard Lipsey - Head Professor of Economics (1963–1969)
 Michio Morishima - Visiting Professor of Economics (1968 to 1970)
 Abhinay Muthoo - Head of Department of Economics (2000 to 2007); Professor of Economics (1998 to 2008); Reader (1995 to 1998); Lecturer (1992 to 1995).
 Motty Perry - Professor of Economics
 Peter C.B. Phillips - Lecturer in Economics (1972 to 1976)
 Anthony Shorrocks - Professor of Economics 
 Anthony Venables - Lecturer in Economics (1978 to 1979)

Sciences
 George Alfred Barnard - Professor of Mathematics (1966 to 1975)
 Richard Bartle - FRSA, Senior Lecturer and Honorary Professor of Computer Science
 Mohammed Ghanbari - Professor, Department of Electronic Systems Engineering (1996 - )
 Martin Henson - FRSA, Professor of Computer Science
 Owen Holland - Professor of Computer Science
 Rodney Loudon - Professor of Theoretical Physics
 Edward Tsang - Director of Centre for Computational Finance and Economic Agents; Professor of Computer Science
 Yorick Wilks - Professor of Computer Science and Linguistics
 Tracy Lawson - Professor of Plant Physiology; Clarivate Highly Cited Researcher

Humanities

 Robert D. Borsley - Professor of Linguistics (2000 - )
 Peter Carruthers - Lecturer, Philosophy Department (1985–1991)
 Donald Davie - Professor of Literature (1964–1968)
 Peter Kenneth Dews - Professor of Philosophy (1988 - )
 Elaine Feinstein - Assistant Lecturer, English Literature (1967–1970)
 David Musselwhite - Senior Lecturer, English Literature (1974–2010)
 José Emilio Pacheco - Visiting Professor of Literature
 Michael Podro - Professor of Art History (1973 to 1997)
 Mark Sacks - Professor of Philosophy (1993–2008)
 Derek Walcott - Nobel Laureate 1992, Professor of Poetry (2010 - 2015)
 Dawn Adès, CBE - Professor of Art History

Law
Steve Peers, Professor of European laws

Social sciences
 Brian Barry - Professor of Politics
 Robin Blackburn - Professor of Sociology
 Jean Blondel - Professor of Politics (1964 to 1984)
 Kevin Boyle - former Director, Human Rights Centre (3 terms)
 Hugh Brogan - Professor of History, (1974 to 1998)
 Ian Craib - Professor of Sociology (1973–2003)
 Vic Gatrell - Professor of British History (2003 - )
 Paul Hunt - former Director, Human Rights Centre (2001 to 2003)
 Bob Jessop - Professor, Department of Government (1975 to 1989)
 Anthony King - Professor, Department of Government
 Alan Knight - Lecturer, History Department (1973 to 1985)
 Ernesto Laclau - Visiting Professor, Department of Government
 Michael Mann
 Geoffrey Martin - Professor, Department of History
 Harvey Molotch - Professor of Sociology
 Sir Nigel S. Rodley - current Head of Human Rights Centre (also a graduate: see below)
 John Scott - Professor of Sociology (1994-2008) and Honorary Doctorate
 Fatos Tarifa - guest lecturer
 Peter Townsend - founding professor of Sociology

Notable alumni

Academia in economics
 Erkin Bairam - Professor of Economics, University of Otago (1991–2001)
 Panicos O. Demetriades - Professor of Financial Economics, University of Leicester
 Jean Drèze - Professor of Economics, Delhi School of Economics
 Colm Kearney - Professor of International Business, University College Dublin
 Graham Loomes - Professor of Economics, University of Warwick
 Christopher A. Pissarides - Nobel Laureate 2010 British-Cypriot Economists, Professor of Economics at the London School of Economics
 Michael Riordan - Professor of Economics, Columbia University
 Norman Schofield - Professor of Political Economy, Washington University in St. Louis
 Richard J. Smith - Professor of Econometric Theory and Economic Statistics, University of Cambridge
 Yanis Varoufakis - Professor of Economics, University of Athens; Finance Minister of Greece (2015 onward)
 John Whalley - Professor of International Trade at University of Western Ontario

Academia in other areas
 Martin J. Ball - Emeritus Professor of Linguistics, Bangor University, Cymru/Wales
 Stephen J. Ball - Karl Mannheim Professor of Sociology of Education at the Institute of Education of University College London 
 Richard Barbrook - Senior Lecturer in Humanities and Social Science, University of Westminster
 John Barrell - Professor of English, University of York
 David M. Barrett - Professor of Political Science, Villanova University
 John Fauvel - historian of mathematics, Open University
 James Gomez - Associate Professor at the School of International Studies, Universiti Utara Malaysia
 Stephen F. Jones - academic in the field of Eastern European affairs
 Kusuma Karunaratne - Sri Lankan academic; university administrator; professor and scholar in the fields of Sinhalese language, comparative literature, and sociology, University of Colombo
 Ernesto Laclau - Post-Marxist political theorist at Northwestern University; Visiting Professor at Essex's Department of Government
 Jill Marsden - scholar of the work of philosopher Friedrich Wilhelm Nietzsche; lecturer at the University of Bolton
 Maxine Molyneux - Professor of Sociology, Institute of Latin American Studies, University of London
 John Warwick Montgomery - American lawyer, theologian and academic known for his work in the field of Christian apologetics; Distinguished Research Professor of Philosophy and Christian Thought at Patrick Henry College
 Farish Ahmad Noor - Senior Fellow, Nanyang Technological University, Singapore
 Alberto Pérez-Gómez - Professor of Architectural History, McGill University
 Nigel S. Rodley - international human rights lawyer and academic, University of Essex
 Deborah Sugg Ryan - Professor of Design History and Theory, University of Portsmouth
 Michael Tappin - academic associated with Keele University
 Michael Taylor - Professor of Politics, University of Washington
 Nathan Widder - Professor of Political Theory, Royal Holloway, University of London
 Jonathan Wilson - Fletcher Professor of Rhetoric and Debate; Director of the Center for Humanities, Tufts University
 Wong Chin Huat - Malaysian political scientist, activist and columnist

Politics and  government

 Martin Docherty-Hughes - Scottish National Party politician
 Óscar Arias - President of Costa Rica and 1987 Nobel Peace Prize Winner
 Ian Austin - Former MP for Dudley North
 John Bercow - Speaker of the House of Commons 
 John Biehl - Chilean lawyer, political scientist and diplomat
 Thozamile Botha - South African politician
 Virginia Bottomley - Conservative Party politician 
 Dragiša Burzan - Serbian Ambassador to the United Kingdom, former Foreign Minister of Montenegro
 Shirin Sharmin Chaudhury - Speaker of the Bangladesh National Assembly
 Fátima Choi - Director of Audit, Macau SAR, China
 James Duddridge - Conservative Party politician, MP for Rochford and Southend East
 Sean Farren - former Northern Irish politician
 Anne Gibson, Baroness Gibson of Market Rasen - British trade unionist
 Reshef Hen - former member of the Knesset
 Peter Housden - Permanent Secretary, Department for Communities and Local Government
 John Howarth - Labour Party Politician, MEP for  South East England
 Ibrahim Jazi -  Jordanian Minister of State for Prime Ministry Affairs
 Omar Asghar Khan - Pakistani social activist, economist and politician
 Leung Yiu-chung - member of the Hong Kong SAR Legislative Council
 Edward Lord - Liberal Democrat politician and a leading figure in English local government
 Siobhain McDonagh - Labour Party politician
 Priti Patel - Conservative Party politician
 Donald C. Pogue - Chief Judge, United States Court of International Trade
 Dimitrij Rupel - first Foreign Minister of Republic of Slovenia
 Mark Shields - Deputy Commissioner of the Jamaica Constabulary Force from 2005 to 2009
 Duncan Shipley-Dalton - former Northern Irish politician
 David Triesman, Baron Triesman - Labour Party Member in the House of Lords; Chairman of the English Football Association
 Yanis Varoufakis - Professor of Economics, University of Athens; Finance Minister of Greece (2015 onward) 
 Hoshyar Zebari - Iraqi Minister of Foreign Affairs

Business and economics
 Richard Douthwaite - economist, co-founder of Feasta
 Már Guðmundsson - Former Governor of the Central Bank of Iceland
 Hanif Lalani - ex-CEO of BT Global Services
 Charles Mbire - Ugandan businessman, entrepreneur and industrialist
 Thorarinn G. Petursson - Chief Economist of the Central Bank of Iceland
 George Provopoulos - Governor of the Bank of Greece and European Central Bank Governing Council Member.

Actors and directors

 Nick Broomfield - documentary filmmaker
 Stephen Daldry - film and theatre director (East 15 Acting School), BAFTA award-winner
 Blake Harrison - actor (Neil from The Inbetweeners) (East 15 Acting School)
 Vera Kolodzig - actress in theatre productions and several Portuguese soap operas (East 15 Acting School)
 Mike Leigh - film and theatre director (East 15 Acting School)
 Alison Steadman - actress (East 15 Acting School), twice nominated for BAFTA award
 David Yates - multi-BAFTA winning English film and television director

Law and order
 Mariela Belski – lawyer; Executive Director, Amnesty International Argentina
 Peter Joslin - Chief Constable of Warwickshire
 Michael J. Todd - Chief Constable of Greater Manchester from 2002 until 2008
 Mark Watson-Gandy – barrister

Media and journalism
 Dotun Adebayo - radio presenter on BBC FiveLive
 Chris Boucher - television screenwriter, script editor and novelist
 Brian Hanrahan - BBC foreign correspondent
 Nick Margerrison - radio presenter on Kerrang! Radio

Musicians
 Gilad Atzmon - Israeli-born British jazz saxophonist
 Clint Boon - keyboardist and lead singer of the Inspiral Carpets
 John Etheridge - British jazz/fusion guitarist associated with the Canterbury Scene
 Steve Chandra Savale - Asian Dub Foundation guitarist

Architecture and urban planning

 Daniel Libeskind - architect of the Freedom Tower and Memory Foundations on the site of the World Trade Center in New York City

Philosophy
 Simon Critchley - British philosopher, academic at the New School for Social Research
 William McNeill - British philosopher, academic at DePaul University

Literary figures and artists
 Kee Thuan Chye - Malaysian dramatist, poet and journalist
 Charlie Connelly - author and broadcaster
 Nick Dear - writer for stage, screen and radio
 Mark Felton - author and historian
 Fraser Harrison - English writer
 Nigel Jenkins - Welsh poet and writer
 John Lawton – novelist
 Marianne Majerus - photographer
 Okello Oculi - Ugandan novelist and poet
 Ben Okri - Booker Prize winner
 Douglas Oliver - English contemporary poet and novelist
 Kate Rhodes - British poet
 Mike Ripley – novelist
 Michelene Wandor - English playwright and poet
 Nathan Zach - Israeli poet
 The Kipper Kids - Performance Artists (at East 15 Acting School)

Science and technology

 Richard Bartle - co-creator of MUD1, the first ever MUD (Multi-User Dungeon)
 Nigel Roberts - Internet naming pioneer, Board Director at ICANN
 Roy Trubshaw - co-creator of MUD1, the first ever MUD (Multi-User Dungeon)
 Rodolfo Neri Vela - Mexico's first astronaut

Human rights

 Akram H. Chowdhury - founder of the Bangladesh Rehabilitation Centre for Trauma Victims
 Alex Neve - Secretary General of Amnesty International Canada
 Carry Somers - Founder and Global Operations Director of Fashion Revolution UK
 Lyal S. Sunga - expert in international human rights law, humanitarian law and international criminal law

References

Essex, University of
University of Essex